Goniapteryx servia is a species of moth in the family Erebidae. It is found in North America.

The MONA or Hodges number for Goniapteryx servia is 8544.

References

Further reading

 
 
 

Hypocalinae
Articles created by Qbugbot
Moths described in 1780